The Inter-Provincial Cup was a soccer super cup organized by the Canadian Soccer Association. It was contested between the men's champions of the Première ligue de soccer du Québec and League1 Ontario, Canada's only domestic Division 3 soccer leagues. The competition was held annually from 2014 to 2016. 

The 2017 edition was cancelled when it was announced that the champions of the two leagues would play against each other in the 2018 Canadian Championship. From the 2019 Canadian Championship onward, a draw takes place in which the PLSQ and L1O entrant cannot be drawn against each other in the first round. However, it is possible that they could play each other in further rounds.

Results

Canadian Championship matchups

References

Soccer competitions in Canada
League1 Ontario
Première ligue de soccer du Québec
Defunct association football competitions